Lobophora may refer to: 
 Lobophora (moth), a genus of moths
 Lobophora (alga), a genus of brown algae
 a synonym for Chelisoches, a genus of earwigs